The 2022 UTEP Miners football team represented the University of Texas at El Paso as a member of Conference USA (C-USA) during the 2022 NCAA Division I FBS football season. They will be led by head coach Dana Dimel, who will be coaching his fifth season with the team. The Miners will play their home games at the Sun Bowl in El Paso, Texas.

Schedule
UTEP and Conference USA announced the 2022 football schedule on March 30, 2022.

Game summaries

North Texas

at No. 9 Oklahoma

New Mexico State

at New Mexico

Boise State

at Charlotte

at Louisiana Tech

Florida Atlantic

Middle Tennessee

at Rice

FIU

at No. 25 UTSA

References

UTEP
UTEP Miners football seasons
UTEP Miners football